Ira Neimark (December 12, 1921 – April 18, 2019) was an American author, lecturer, and retail executive who served as Chairman and CEO of Bergdorf Goodman from 1975 to 1992. His reintroduction of French haute couture to New York with Yves Saint Laurent, Hubert de Givenchy, and Christian Dior sparked a period of growth for Bergdorf Goodman, which went from $18 million in sales in 1975 to $250 million in sales by 1992. During his tenure, he expanded the women's store and in 1991, he opened the Bergdorf Goodman Men's Store across the street from the primary location in New York.

Early life 

Neimark was born December 12, 1921, in Brooklyn, New York and was the son of attorney Eugene G. Neimark and Lillian (Braude) Neimark. After his father's death, the 16-year-old Neimark sought employment in late 1938. He was hired by Bonwit Teller for "a Christmas job as a page[boy] in the store's 721 Club for men, a shop offering a sampling of the store's best items." After the Christmas season of 1938, he continued to work for Bonwit Teller as a doorboy, greeting customers as they entered the store. In 1940, he was promoted to office boy by the store president, and then to the position of stock boy in 1941.

Neimark attended Erasmus Hall in the Flatbush neighborhood of Brooklyn, but did not receive his diploma until after the end of World War II, in 1945. His graduation was delayed due to working and to enlisting in 1942 in the U.S. Army Air Corps as an Aviation Cadet. He served in Saipan with the 20th Air Force, 498 squadron. Prior to his enlistment, he took evening classes in 1941 and 1942 at Columbia Business School. (Columbia lists him an alumnus, despite the fact that he did not earn a degree, and invited him back as an adjunct professor during 1983 and 1984; he was also a guest lecturer from 2009 to 2014.)

Retail career 
After his service in WWII, Neimark returned to Bonwit Teller, serving as manager of Merchandise Control, and then assistant to the president. After promotion to blouse buyer at the luxury department store, he then moved to McCreery's in New York in 1950. In 1951, he was hired by Gladdings in Providence, Rhode Island, as divisional merchandise manager for which he was paid $9,000 a year. In 1959, he moved to the prestigious G. Fox & Co. in Hartford, Connecticut, as assistant to the general merchandise manager. Soon after, G. Fox's owner, Beatrice Fox Auerbach, asked him to assume the presidency of one of the company's affiliated stores, the far less prestigious Brown Thompson. In 1967, he returned from Brown Thompson and was made vice president and general merchandise manager of G. Fox & Co. After Auerbach's death, Neimark moved to B. Altman and Company, located at Fifth Avenue and 34th Street in New York, where he became executive vice-president and general merchandise manager in 1970. In 1975, he assumed the reins of Bergdorf Goodman from Andrew Goodman; it made him the first non-family-member to lead the company since its founding in 1899.

Neimark set out to transform the store from "old, dull, expensive, and intimidating" to "young, exciting, expensive, and intimidating". His primary strategy was to put designers in the lead and, to that end, recruited Dawn Mello to head the store's fashion office.

Neimark embarked on strategy to bring top designers from around the world into an exclusive arrangement with Bergdorf Goodman. The first step of the "Italian Strategy", which was representative of the approach, was to lure the house of Fendi to Bergdorf Goodman, which was done through personal contact and the promise of strong promotion and featured placement.

Regarding the promise of promotion, Bergdorf Goodman became known for doing extravaganzas, which garnered attention from The New York Times, Women's Wear Daily, and celebrities of the day.

Back in 1981, the store organized a show for Fendi furs at the nearby Pulitzer Fountain. The fountain was the runway, and the tiers were lined with black Mylar and filled with gallons of water.

Donna Karan and Michael Kors also had their careers launched through fashion shows at Bergdorf Goodman.

Beginning with Neimark's reintroduction of French couture to New York, a period of growth for Bergdorf Goodman lasted throughout his tenure and beyond as president and CEO. He took the company from $18 million in sales in 1975 to $250 million in sales by 1992.

Professional honors 

The governments of Italy and France awarded Neimark the Cavaliere Della Republica and the Chevalier of the Order of Arts and Letters, respectively, as well as the Medal of the City of Paris. He was a Director Emeritus of Hermés of Paris and formerly a director of The Fashion Institute of Technology Foundation.

Personal life 
While working at Gladdings in Providence, Rhode Island, Neimark's friends facilitated a blind date with Jackie Myers, the handbag buyer for T.W. Rounds, which specialized in prestige leather goods and, at its peak, had 11 locations in New England. She is the daughter of Harry M. and Yetta Goodman Myers, who owned T.W. Rounds. They married on March 10, 1953. They had two daughters.

Neimark died on April 18, 2019, at his home in Harrison, New York.

Activities 
After his retirement, Neimark served as a guest lecturer at Columbia Business School and presented to business students at The Wharton School, George Mason University.

He wrote four books about his experiences as a successful luxury retail executive: Crossing Fifth Avenue to Bergdorf Goodman (2006), The Rise of Fashion (2011), A Retailer's Lifetime of Lessons Learned (2012), and The Rise of Bergdorf Goodman and the Fall of Bonwit Teller (2015).

References 

1921 births
2019 deaths
United States Army personnel of World War II
American chief executives
American non-fiction writers
Businesspeople from New York City
Columbia Business School alumni
Military personnel from New York City
Writers from Brooklyn
20th-century American Jews
20th-century American businesspeople
21st-century American Jews